Jean-Luc Ponty in Concert is a DVD and live CD by French jazz fusion artist Jean-Luc Ponty, released in 2003. Originally, the DVD with the concert performance in Warsaw, Poland was released.

Track listing 
All songs by Jean-Luc Ponty unless otherwise noted.
 "Rhythms of Hope" – 7:57
 "Jig" – 8:07
 "No Absolute Time" – 10:38
 "Pastoral Harmony" – 8:25
 "Caracas" – 8:36
 "Memories of California" –  5:41
 "Mouna Bowa" (Ponty, Guy N'Sangue) – 8:59
 "Enigmatic Ocean, Pt. 2" – 7:16
 "Open Mind" – 5:14

Personnel
Jean-Luc Ponty – violin, keyboards, Synclavier, electronic percussion, electronic drums, effects
William Lecomte – piano
Guy N'Sangue – bass
Thierry Arpino – drums
Moustapha Cisse – percussion

References

Jean-Luc Ponty live albums
2003 live albums